is an anime television series produced by A-1 Pictures, and based on the light novel series of the same name written by Fumiaki Maruto and illustrated by Kurehito Misaki. The anime adaptation is directed by Kanta Kamei and written by Maruto, featuring character designs by Tomoaki Takase and music by Hajime Hyakkoku. The first season consisting of 13 episodes began airing on January 9, 2015 and finished airing on March 27, 2015. A second season consisting of 12 episodes, titled Saekano: How to Raise a Boring Girlfriend Flat, began airing on April 14, 2017 and finished airing on June 23, 2017, with a web-only "episode 0" releasing on April 6, 2017.

It has been licensed in North America by Aniplex of America, and in Australia and New Zealand by Madman Entertainment. The second season was exclusively streamed on Amazon Video.


Episode list

(2015)

: Flat (2017)

Notes

References

External links
 
 

Saekano: How to Raise a Boring Girlfriend